Mill Pond is a  pond in Duxbury, Massachusetts in the village of Island Creek. The pond is located south of Island Creek Pond. Island Creek runs through the pond. Route 3A runs along the southern shore of the pond. The water quality is impaired due to non-native aquatic plants in the pond. The fishway at the Mill Pond dam has deteriorated and no longer functions.

External links
Mill Pond, Island Creek Pond, Island Creek Information
Environmental Protection Agency
South Shore Coastal Watersheds - Lake Assessments

Ponds of Plymouth County, Massachusetts
Duxbury, Massachusetts
Ponds of Massachusetts